Masanori Sugiura (杉浦 正則, born May 23, 1968) is a retired Japanese Olympic baseball player from Kudoyama, Wakayama, Japan.

Sugiura was the ace pitcher of the Nippon Life Insurance Company baseball team, and was chosen to join the Japanese national team in the 1992 Summer Olympics, where he won a bronze medal. He returned to the olympics four years later, winning a silver medal at the 1996 Summer Olympics. Professional players were allowed to participate in the 2000 Summer Olympics, but Sugiura was still chosen as the captain of the Japanese national team, and the captain of the entire Japanese olympic team in 2000 Summer Olympics. The Japanese team did not win a medal that year.

Sugiura refused numerous offers to join the Japanese professional leagues, and retired in 2000. The Nippon Life Insurance Company baseball team won the Intercity Baseball Tournament twice during the 10 years Sugiura played with the team. He also marked a record five career wins in the olympic tournaments.

He served as a pitching coach for his team from 2001–2004, and became the manager in 2006.

References

1968 births
Living people
Baseball players at the 1992 Summer Olympics
Baseball players at the 1996 Summer Olympics
Baseball players at the 2000 Summer Olympics
Olympic baseball players of Japan
Olympic bronze medalists for Japan
Olympic silver medalists for Japan
People from Wakayama Prefecture
Olympic medalists in baseball
Asian Games medalists in baseball
Baseball players at the 1990 Asian Games
Baseball players at the 1994 Asian Games
Medalists at the 1996 Summer Olympics
Medalists at the 1992 Summer Olympics
Asian Games gold medalists for Japan
Medalists at the 1994 Asian Games
20th-century Japanese people